The 2022 Columbus Crew season was the club's twenty-seventh season of existence and their twenty-seventh consecutive season in Major League Soccer, the top flight of American soccer. The season covered the period from November 8, 2021 to the end of the 2022 season. It was the fourth and final season under head coach Caleb Porter.

Roster

Out on loan

Non-competitive

Preseason

Competitive

MLS

Standings

Eastern Conference

Overall table

Results summary

Results by round

Match results
On November 22, 2021 the league announced the home openers for every club, with Columbus playing the Vancouver Whitecaps FC at Lower.com Field. The full 2022 season was released on December 15, 2021.

U.S. Open Cup

On July 20, 2021 US Soccer announced that the tournament would be cancelled for 2021 and would resume in 2022. The Crew will be one of 17 MLS teams entering in the Third round of the tournament.

Third Round

Statistics

Appearances and goals
Under "Apps" for each section, the first number represents the number of starts, and the second number represents appearances as a substitute.

Disciplinary record

Clean sheets

Transfers

In

Loan in

SuperDraft

The following players were selected by Columbus in the MLS SuperDraft.

Out

Loans out

Kits

See also
 Columbus Crew
 2022 in American soccer
 2022 Major League Soccer season

Notes

References

Columbus Crew seasons
Columbus Crew
Columbus Crew
Columbus Crew